Randolph School is an American independent private Pre-K-through-12th-grade college preparatory school chartered in 1959 in Huntsville, Madison County, Alabama. It started in a home on Randolph Avenue in downtown Huntsville with a handful of elementary classes. A few years later it moved to a much larger  campus on Drake Avenue, where it is now located, gradually adding grade levels until having a graduating high school class in the early 1970s.

The new high school opened for the 2009–2010 school year. For the fine arts, the new facilities include a new theater with stadium seating, a workshop for stagecraft, band and choral rooms, and new restroom facilities. In total, Randolph has two gymnasiums, four tennis courts, two practice fields and professionally maintained fields for football, baseball, softball and soccer.

In 2014, Randolph received a grant from the Edward E. Ford Foundation to help the school begin to address the long-term sustainability of a robust tuition assistance program.

Academic awards and other recognition

During the 2001–02 school year, and again in 2003–04, Randolph School was recognized with the Blue Ribbon School Award of Excellence by the United States Department of Education, the highest award an American school can receive.

Between a fifth and a third of each graduating class is identified as a Commended Scholar, Semi-Finalist, or Finalist in the National Merit Scholarship competition. Virtually all graduates go on to attend four-year college.

Athletics
Randolph School athletic teams have won 47 AHSAA state titles and finished as runners up 51 times. Randolph athletes have also taken home 24 individuals state titles. Most varsity teams currently compete in the AHSAA 4A division. The Randolph boys have won the Cross Country State Championships in 1982, as well as 2005–2013, setting a new state record for most consecutive state championship wins in Alabama with 9. They were runners up in 2014 and 2018. The girls Cross Country team won in 1978, 1979, 1980, 1996, and 1998, and were runners-up in 2013, 2014 and 2015. The boys soccer team won State Championships in 2000, 2001, 2002, 2006, 2007, 2015, 2017 and 2018. The Raiders Varsity Boys Soccer were also ranked 3rd nationally in 2006 and first in the Southeast. In 2012, the boys lost in the state championship game to rival Altamont School. They again were state runners-up in 2014, losing to Indian Springs. In 2015, they defeated St. Paul's Episcopal School 3–2 in the finals. The Randolph soccer team has either been state runner up or state champs since the year 2000, except 2004, 2005, and 2010. The girls soccer team won their first state championship in 2009 and won again in 2013, defeating Montgomery Academy after losing to them in the finals in 2012. The girls team were again state runners-up in 2014, losing to Montgomery Academy. They were also state champions in 2015. The boys tennis team won the state championship in 1984 and 2008, and has finished runner-up in 2002, 2007, 2009, and 2019. The boys tennis team also won the state sportsmanship award in 2008 and 2009. The girls tennis team finished as the state runner-up in 2012. The girls volleyball team won the state title in 1983, 1985 and 2015. For the first time in 30 years, Randolph fielded a varsity football program in 2010. The team reached the playoffs for the first time in 2015, and have done so in every season since.

Technology 
In 1981, Randolph became one of the first high schools to provide its students with a computer lab donated by Intergraph, a local software and computer hardware company. The lab had a PDP-11/44 with 14 terminals, a console and printer. Wiring ran through the ceiling – a sharp departure from other computer labs of the day.

Randolph instituted a Bulletin Board System, enhanced by the donation of a 1200 baud modem in 1984 by local television station WAAY-TV. The bulletin board was entirely custom software running on the PDP-11, written by students. Some years later, Randolph hosted the Igmeister Zone BBS, a WWIV node at speeds up to 9600 bit/s.

National press coverage in 1998 covered the school's implementation of a wireless network which integrated the use of laptops.

Notable alumni 
Its alumni include many of the children of the German rocket scientists that moved to Huntsville with Wernher von Braun after World War II.  Other notable alumni include:

Alex Clay – Former professional soccer player for Tampa Bay Rowdies 2 in the National Premier Soccer League
Macon Phillips – White House Director of Digital Strategy in the Obama Administration
 Susanna Phillips (graduated 1999) – Soprano opera singer at the Metropolitan Opera in New York City
 Brian Reynolds (game designer) – Chief Game Designer for Zynga, co-founder of Firaxis and Big Huge Games
 Bryan Shelton – Florida Gators men's tennis head coach and six-time Wimbledon participant
 Jimmy Wales – Co-founder of Wikipedia

References

External links 

 Official web site

Educational institutions established in 1959
Education in Huntsville, Alabama
Private elementary schools in Alabama
Private middle schools in Alabama
High schools in Huntsville, Alabama
Schools in Madison County, Alabama
Private high schools in Alabama
Preparatory schools in Alabama
1959 establishments in Alabama